Echiniscoides sigismundi is a species of marine tardigrade.  It lives in seaweeds or plates of barnacles, or more generally in algal strongholds in inter-tidal areas.

Taxonomy
Echiniscoides sigismundi is the type species of Echiniscoides. Described in 1865 as Echiniscus sigismundii, it was placed in a separate genus by Ludwig Hermann Plate in 1888.

Distribution
By 1936, it was reported in most seas of Northern Europe, and in the Mediterranean and the Caribbean.

The Light and Smith Manual describes its distribution as cosmopolitan, in the upper inter-tidal.

Osmobiosis
Echiniscoides sigismundi becomes turgid in freshwater, but can survive up to three days, resuming normal activity as osmotic differential returns to normal.

Infraspecies
 Echiniscoides sigismundi galliensis Kristensen and Hallas, 1980
 Echiniscoides sigismundi groenlandicus Kristensen and Hallas, 1980
 Echiniscoides sigismundi hispaniensis Kristensen and Hallas, 1980
 Echiniscoides sigismundi mediterranicus Kristensen and Hallas, 1980
 Echiniscoides sigismundi polynesiensis Renaud-Mornant, 1976
 Echiniscoides sigismundi porphyrae Grimaldi de Zio, Gallo D'Addabbo and Pietanza, 2000
 Echiniscoides sigismundi sigismundi (M. Schultze, 1865) 
 Echiniscoides sigismundi verrucariae Grimaldi de Zio, Gallo D'Addabbo and Pietanza, 2000

See also
 Tardigrada
 Heterotardigrada

References

Bibliography
 R.O. Schuster, and A. A. Grigarick, 1965. Tardigrada from Western North America With Emphasis on the Fauna of California. University of California Publications in Zoology, vol. 76: 1-67.
 Roberto Guidetti and Roberto Bertolani, 2005. Tardigrade taxonomy: an updated check list of the taxa and a list of characters for their identification. Zootaxa, issue 845: 1-46. Abstract
 Peter Degma, Roberto Bertolani|, Roberto Guidetti, 2010. Actual checklist of Tardigrada species (Ver. 12: 16-04-2010). 
 D. J. Crisp and J. Hobart. A note on the habitat of the marine tardigrade Echiniscoides sigismundi (Shultze) (Payment needed for full article) Ann. Mag. Nat. Hist. ser 12, 7: 554-560

External links

Animals described in 1865
Echiniscoididae